Pleasant View is an extinct town in Walla Walla County, in the U.S. state of Washington.

Pleasant View was laid out in 1894.

References

Ghost towns in Washington (state)
Geography of Walla Walla County, Washington